Prosopocera is a genus of flat-faced longhorn beetles in the subfamily Lamiinae.

Species
 Prosopocera alboplagiata Jordan, 1894
 Prosopocera albovestita Breuning, 1936
 Prosopocera angolensis Quedenfeldt, 1885
 Prosopocera antennata Gahan, 1890
 Prosopocera belzebuth Thomson, 1857
 Prosopocera bicolor Westwood, 1845
 Prosopocera bipunctata (Drury, 1773)
 Prosopocera blairi Breuning, 1936
 Prosopocera brunnea Breuning, 1936
 Prosopocera callypiga (Thomson, 1857)
 Prosopocera cylindrica Aurivillius, 1903
 Prosopocera decellei Breuning, 1968
 Prosopocera escalerai Báguena, 1952
 Prosopocera francoisiana Lepesme, 1948
 Prosopocera fryi Murray, 1871
 Prosopocera fuscomaculata Breuning, 1936
 Prosopocera gassneri Breuning, 1936
 Prosopocera gigantea Breuning, 1950
 Prosopocera griseomaculata Breuning, 1936
 Prosopocera humeralis Breuning, 1938
 Prosopocera insignis Jordan, 1903
 Prosopocera lactator (Fabricius, 1801)
 Prosopocera lydiae Bjornstad & Minetti, 2010
 Prosopocera mediomaculata Breuning, 1938
 Prosopocera myops Chevrolat, 1855
 Prosopocera parinsignis Breuning, 1970
 Prosopocera prasina Breuning, 1936
 Prosopocera princeps  (Hope, 1843)
 Prosopocera pseudotchadensis Breuning, 1981
 Prosopocera regia Breuning, 1936
 Prosopocera schoutedeni Breuning, 1936
 Prosopocera signatifrons Duvivier, 1891
 Prosopocera spinipennis Breuning, 1954
 Prosopocera subvalida Breuning, 1954
 Prosopocera superbrunnea Breuning, 1969
 Prosopocera undulata Schwarzer, 1929
 Prosopocera usambarica Breuning, 1954
 Prosopocera valida Aurivillius, 1927
 Prosopocera viridegrisea Hintz, 1911

References
 Biolib
 Worldwide Cerambycoidea Photo Gallery

Prosopocerini